Grand Forks County Courthouse is a Beaux Arts style building in Grand Forks, North Dakota that was listed on the National Register of Historic Places in 1980. It is a "richly decorated white limestone structure in a modified Classical Revival style, topped with a massive cast iron dome."

It was built during 1913–1914. It was designed by Minnesota architects Buechner & Orth. The courthouse is identified as the largest and most expensive of 13 county courthouses in North Dakota designed by Buechner and Orth during 1905–1919.

Considerable additional detail on the building is provided in its NRHP nomination document.  The NRHP listing was for just the one contributing building, with no specific property area identified.

References

Courthouses on the National Register of Historic Places in North Dakota
County courthouses in North Dakota
Government buildings completed in 1914
Beaux-Arts architecture in North Dakota
Neoclassical architecture in North Dakota
National Register of Historic Places in Grand Forks, North Dakota
1914 establishments in North Dakota